Chinni Prakash is an Indian film choreographer, art director, actor, script-writer, director. He is best known for his choreographic work in numerous Bollywood films. Chinni Prakash is the acclaimed choreographer of Kannada, Telugu and Hindi films.

Personal life

From his childhood Chinni Prakash always wanted to make it big in Hindi films. After finishing his studies, he came to Bombay and with time, he started working as an assistant to many choreographers.

Chinni Prakash is married to Rekha Chinni Prakash who also is a choreographer and they work together. His first stint as a full-fledged choreographer was for film Khandan.

Career

Chinni Prakash got his first stint as a full-fledged choreographer was for film Khandan. He made a pair with choreographer Sampath and choreographed songs for many big films like Ram Aur Shyam (1967), Sadhu Aur Shaitaan (1968), and Haathi Mere Saathi (1971). However, after Sabse Bada Rupaiya (1976), Chinni Prakash disappeared completely. Chinni Prakash came back to Hindi films as a solo choreographer with Hero Hiralal (1988). His dances for "Bambai Humko Jam Gayi" (Swarg) became very popular but it was his choreography for the song "Jumma Chumma" from movie Hum that did the trick for him. Chinni Prakash suddenly became one of the most sought-after choreographers of Hindi cinema.

Chinni Prakash then was a part of many big films in the early 1990s like Saajan (1991), Khuda Gawah (1992) and Gumrah (1993). Later, he particularly became a fav. With Akshay Kumar and gave him many hit dance moves in films like Khiladi (1992), Mohra (1994), Main Khiladi Tu Anari (1994), Sabse Bada Khiladi (1995), Khiladiyon Ka Khiladi (1996) and Keemat (1998). He was also a hit with Govinda and did his dances in Coolie No. 1 (1995), Gambler (1995) and Bade Miyan Chote Miyan (1998).

Karan Arjun (1995) and Gupt (1997) have two of his most famous dance numbers. With the coming of the 21st century, Chinni Prakash’s work started getting lesser as his dances were not in sync with the requirement of the contemporary Hindi films. Although his choreography in Dhadkan (2000) and Jodi No.1 (2001) was appreciated, he was not certainly as popular and in demand as earlier.

Chinni Prakash has won the National Award and Filmfare Best Choreographer award both for his work.

His wife is the well known choreographer Rekha Chinni Prakash. He also trained his niece Vaibhavi Merchant, who gave us the moves in "Kajra Re", among many other filmi songs. He is known for his talent of controlling huge crowds of background dancers in extreme conditions.

Filmography

Choreography

Awards

Chinni Prakash got National Film Award for Best Choreography for the song, "Azeem-O-Shaan Shahenshah" movie Jodha Akbar.

Chinni Prakash has won the Filmfare Best Choreographer award 1992 for 'Jumma Chumma De De' ( Hum), in 1995 for ‘Tu cheez badi hai mast mast’ (Mohra) and in 1997 ‘Shehar Ki Ladki’ (Rakshak) respectively.

He also received the Tamil Nadu State Film Award for Best Choreographer for the movie Thavasi in 2001.

References

External links

Indian film choreographers
Living people
Filmfare Awards winners
Indian choreographers
Best Choreography National Film Award winners
Year of birth missing (living people)